Bąków  is a village in the administrative district of Gmina Grodków, within Brzeg County, Opole Voivodeship, in south-western Poland.

The village has an approximate population of 600.

Places of cultural and tourist interest
 St. Catherine's Church (kościół filialny pw. św. Katarzyny) - a Roman Catholic church built during the reign of Preczlaw of Pogarell in the Gothic architectural style. The church was built under the patronage of the commandry of the Sovereign Military Order of Malta in Oleśnica Mała. In between the years of 1535 and 1945 the church was an evangelical church.

References

Villages in Brzeg County